11 Somerset is a Canadian children's television series that airs in French on Télé-Québec and in English on A-Channel.

It focuses on Laurie Lamera (Jessica Malka) and Oliver Marsan (Jamieson Boulanger), two teenagers who investigate paranormal phenomena. It also stars Kathleen Mackey as Laurie's sidekick Lucy Mercer.

The show has been adapted into a point-and-click computer adventure game (linked to from www.gamershood.com) containing 13 adventures where players must find and use tools, clues, and technology to solve increasingly difficult puzzles.

Cast
 Jamieson Boulanger as Oliver Marsan (13 episodes, 2004-2005)
 Lorne Brass as John Marsan (10 episodes, 2004-2005)
 Marie Turgeon as Helen Lamera (8 episodes, 2004-2005)
 Jessica Malka as Laurence Lamera
 Daniel Rousse as Lenny Moss
 Joseph Antaki as Mario Benedetti
 Shawn Baichoo as Luc Blackburn
 Orphée Ladouceur as Thanh Bein Nguyen
 Christian Paul as Anthony Murat
 Kathleen Mackey as Lucie Mercier 
 Judith Baribeau as Magali Lemay

Episode List
Note: Episode synopsizes translated from French source using google translate.

References

External links
 https://www.imdb.com/title/tt0385368/
 https://web.archive.org/web/20140822142124/http://11somerset.telequebec.tv/

2000s Canadian children's television series
Télé-Québec original programming
CTV 2 original programming
Canadian children's horror television series
Canadian supernatural television series
Television series about teenagers